Howland is a town in Penobscot County, Maine, United States, which was settled in 1818.  It was named after John Howland, one of the passengers on the Mayflower. The population was 1,094 at the 2020 census.

Geography
The town is on the west bank of the Penobscot River at the confluence with the Piscataquis River.

Climate
This climatic region is typified by large seasonal temperature differences, with warm to hot (and often humid) summers and cold (sometimes severely cold) winters.  2. According to the Köppen Climate Classification system, Howland has a humid continental climate, abbreviated "Dfb" on climate maps.

Demographics

As of the 2000 census, the median income for a household in the town was $34,082, and the median income for a family was $36,302. Males had a median income of $32,000 versus $17,386 for females. The per capita income for the town was $15,466.  About 6.9% of families and 11.5% of the population were below the poverty line, including 10.8% of those under the age of 18 and 25.3% ages 65 or older.

2010 census
As of the 2010 census, there were 1,241 people, 523 households, and 330 families residing in the town. There were 639 housing units at an average density of 18.3 per square mile (7.1/km2). The racial makeup of the town was 97.4% White, 0.6% African American, 0.6% Native American, 0.2% Asian, and 1.3% from two or more races. Hispanic or Latino of any race were 0.4% of the population.

There were 523 households, of which 22.4% had children under the age of 18 living with them, 49.1% were headed by married couples living together, 9.8% had a female householder with no husband present, and 36.9% were non-families. 30.0% of all households were made up of individuals, and 16.2% were someone living alone who was 65 years of age or older.  The average household size was 2.32, and the average family size was 2.82.

In the town, the population was spread out, with 19.3% under the age of 18, 8.1% from 18 to 24, 21.6% from 25 to 44, 29.9% from 45 to 64, and 21.2% who were 65 years of age or older.  The median age was 45.5 years.

Local schools
See MSAD 31

Notable people 

 Matthew Mulligan (born 1985), free agent NFL tight end, most recently for the Detroit Lions
 Percy Spencer (1894–1970), engineer and inventor of the microwave oven

Fire and ambulance

Located in Howland, Maine, Howland Fire & EMS provides 24/7 coverage for Howland, as well as neighboring towns Enfield, Passadumkeag, Edinburg, Maxfield, and Mattamiscontis. The department largely consist of volunteers and part-time EMS providers. The department is funded by an annual budget from the Town of Howland and fire service contracts with other towns. Other equipment purchases which the town cannot afford are paid for through fundraising efforts.

Since the 2015, the department has undergone several changes that have resulted in a more modern, efficient service. With the adoption of new technology, as well as the department's recent launch of a website focused on recruiting and informing the public of news, announcements and fire safety related content, the department has grown into one of the leading volunteer departments in northern Maine.

See also
  School Administrative Unit 31

References

External links
 

Towns in Penobscot County, Maine
Towns in Maine
Populated places established in 1818
1818 establishments in Maine